No 297 Squadron was a squadron of the Royal Air Force.  It was notable for being the first airborne forces squadron formed. With sister No 296 Squadron it formed No 38 Wing RAF in January 1942, joined in August by No 295 Squadron; the Wing expanded in 1943 to become No 38 Group RAF. The squadron saw action in Sicily and took part in the D-Day invasion and Operation Market Garden. It was disbanded in 1950.

History

Formation and World War II
The squadron originally formed as the Parachute Exercise Squadron at RAF Ringway on 15 December 1941 and moved to RAF Netheravon on 22 January 1942, then officially becoming No 297 Squadron RAF. In February 1942 they were equipped with Whitley Mark V aircraft.  The squadron moved to RAF Hurn on 5 June 1942 and to RAF Thruxton on 24 October 1942.  In July 1943 the squadron was equipped with the first of the Albemarle Mk. I aircraft, which they kept until December 1944 while being supplemented with the Albemarle Mk. II in February 1944, the Albemarle Mk. V in April 1944 and the Albemarle Mk. VI in July 1944. In 1943 the squadron flew Albemarles to Algeria to take part in Operation Husky, the invasion of Sicily, returning to Britain the same year.

The squadron moved to RAF Station Stoney Cross on 25 August 1943, where they practiced parachute drops with the 8th Battalion, Parachute regiment and 22 independent parachute regiment in preparation for the D-Day invasion. They then moved to RAF Station Brize Norton on 14 March 1944 to practice towing Horsa gliders in preparation for the capture of the Caen canal and Orne river bridges (now known as Pegasus Bridge) and the Merville Battery located on the Normandy coast overlooking Sword Beach. Their involvement in the D-Day operation was:

  At 11:00 PM on Mon 5 June 1944 four Albemarles dropped ten men of the 22nd Independent Parachute Company and thirty paratroopers comprising the Advance Party of the 5th Parachute Brigade near Ranville
  Later that night nine Albemarles dropped paratroops of the 5th Parachute Brigade as part of the main force
  At 3:30 AM on D-Day itself a further 8 Horsa gliders were towed to the drop zone
  Three Horsas were towed over manned by elements of 9th Parachute Battalion and engineers of the 591st Parachute Squadron to attack and silence the Merville Battery.
  Later that day 19 more Horsas were towed across. One aircraft was shot down.

In September 1944 the squadron played its part in Operation Market Garden after temporarily moving to RAF Station Manston.  They towed 29 Horsa and 2 Waco gliders in the first wave and 24 Horsas in the second, all without loss. On 30 September 1944 the squadron moved to RAF Station Earls Colne where the process of changing the Albemarles for the Halifax Mk.V was started, the squadron received additional Halifax Mk.III aircraft in February 1945 and Halifax A.7 in December 1945.  On 24 March 1945 thirty Halifax aircraft towed Horsas manned with 6th Airborne paratroops to effect a successful Rhine crossing. The squadron was disbanded on 1 April 1946.

Post-war
The squadron was reformed in a peacetime role on 1 April 1946 at RAF Station Tarrant Rushton and merged with 295 squadron, keeping the 297 Squadron markings.  The reformed squadron kept the Halifax A.7 aircraft and moved to RAF Brize Norton on 5 September 1946.  In January 1947 the squadron was re-equipped with Halifax A.9 aircraft which they kept until October 1948, during this time they moved to RAF Station Fairford on 21 August 1947 and to RAF Station Dishforth on 1 November 1948. In November 1948 the Squadron was equipped with Hastings C.1 aircraft until November 1950.  During this time the squadron moved as a detachment to Schleswig returning to RAF Station Topcliffe on 22 August 1949 where they stayed until 15 November 1950 when the squadron was disbanded.

Aircraft operated

Squadron station

Commanding officers

See also
 No 38 Group RAF
 List of Royal Air Force aircraft squadrons

References

Notes

Bibliography

External links

 297 Squadron, 38 Group : History

297
Military units and formations established in 1941
No. 297
Military units and formations disestablished in 1950